Slobodan Veljković (born 11 April 1985), known professionally as Coby, is a Serbian rapper, songwriter and record producer. Born in Belgrade and raised in Prokuplje, in 2007, he relocated back to Belgrade where he began working with Rexxxona and his record label Bassivity.

Coby gained more significant success by writing and producing songs for pop-folk singers like Boban Rajović, Dara Bubamara and Ana Nikolić. As a recording artist he rose to mainstream prominence in 2015, with the single "Ideš za Kanadu" featuring THCF, released for the purposes of the crime documentary series Dosije.

Coby has collaborated with numerous acts, including Elitni Odredi, Rasta, Nikolija, Senidah, Jala Brat, Buba Corelli, Sara Jo, Nataša Bekvalac, Bojana Vunturišević and Teodora. His is known for blending hip hop music with the elements of Serbian folk music. His songs often feature the signature watermark "Coby, jesi li ti radio traku?" (Coby, did you do the track?).

In January 2023, Veljković became the first recipient of the Master of Ceremony Award at the Music Awards Ceremony, for his success in music.

Discography

Singles

As lead artist

As featured artist

Awards and nominations

External links

References

1985 births
Living people
People from Prokuplje
21st-century Serbian male singers
Serbian rappers
Serbian record producers